The 2009 Scottish Challenge Cup final was played on 22 November 2009 at McDiarmid Park in Perth and was the 19th Scottish Challenge Cup final. The final was contested by Dundee and Inverness CT. Dundee won the match 3–2.

Route to the final

Dundee

Inverness Caledonian Thistle

Match details

References

2009
Dundee F.C. matches
Inverness Caledonian Thistle F.C. matches
Finals
Challenge Cup Final
Sport in Perth, Scotland